The Dodge Custom Royal is an automobile which was produced by Dodge in the United States for the 1955 through 1959 model years. In each of these years the Custom Royal was the top trim level of the Dodge line, above the mid level Dodge Royal and the base level Dodge Coronet. 2-Door Hardtop, 4-Door Hardtop and Convertible models were marketed under the name "Dodge Custom Royal Lancer".

A La Femme option was available on 1955 and 1956 Dodge Custom Royal Lancer models.

Australian production
The Custom Royal was assembled by Chrysler Australia at its Mile End plant in South Australia from early 1958 utilizing CKD kits imported from Detroit. It was offered only as a four-door sedan.

See also
 1955 Dodge
 1958 Dodge

References

Custom Royal
Rear-wheel-drive vehicles
Cars introduced in 1955